is a 2016 Japanese television drama created by Noriko Goto, starring Shingo Katori, Juri Ueno, Kiko Mizuhara, Jun Fubuki and Toshiyuki Nishida. It premiered on TBS on Sundays at 21:00 (JST) from January 17, 2016 to March 20, 2016.

Cast 
 Shingo Katori as Daisuke Nagasato 
 Juri Ueno as Hanako Kumagai
 Kiko Mizuhara as Rina Tanaka
 Jun Fubuki as Ritsuko Kumagai
 Toshiyuki Nishida as Yozo Nagasato
 Yoshiyoshi Arakawa as Shoichi Sasaki
 Yudai Chiba as Haruto Irie
 Kanako Yanai as Satori Yamane
 Hyoga Takada as Kota Nagasato
 Anne Nakamura as Aya Kozue
 Alisa Mizuki as Mika Ono
 Kei Tanaka as Kazuya Takase
 Leo Morimoto as San Shige
 Yoko Asaji as Misayo Nagasato
 Miki Mizuno as Megumi Nagasato
 Mariya Nagao as Yuka Koyama

Episodes

References

External links
  
 

2016 in Japanese television
Japanese drama television series
2016 Japanese television series debuts
2016 Japanese television series endings
Nichiyō Gekijō